Wakelam is a surname. Notable people with the surname include:

Michael Wakelam (1955–2020), British molecular biologist
Stephen Wakelam, English writer and playwright
Teddy Wakelam (1893–1963), English broadcaster and rugby player

See also
Wakeham (surname)